Parliamentary elections were held in the Federated States of Micronesia on 2 March 1999. All candidates for seats in Congress ran as independents.

Results

References

Micronesia
1999 in the Federated States of Micronesia
Elections in the Federated States of Micronesia
Non-partisan elections